9-Aminoacridine is a highly fluorescent dye used clinically as a topical antiseptic and experimentally as a mutagen, an intracellular pH indicator and a small molecule MALDI matrix.

See also
 2-Aminoacridine
 3-Aminoacridine
 4-Aminoacridine

References

Aromatic amines
Acridines
DNA intercalaters